Albert and Wilhelmina Thomas House, also known as the Walter A. Schroeder House, is a historic home located in Jefferson City, Cole County, Missouri. It was originally built in 1874 as the German Methodist Episcopal Church.  In 1930, the church was altered to a -story, three bay, two family flat with an eclectic style.  It is a stuccoed brick building with a steeply pitched roof.

It was listed on the National Register of Historic Places in 2002.

References

Houses on the National Register of Historic Places in Missouri
Houses completed in 1930
Buildings and structures in Jefferson City, Missouri
National Register of Historic Places in Cole County, Missouri